Sayeda Motahera Banu is a Bangladesh writer and winner of the Independence Day Award in 2001, the highest civilian award in Bangladesh, for her contribution to literature in Bangladesh. In 2020, she was appointed to the Board of Trustees of Nazrul Institute.

References

Recipients of the Independence Day Award
Bangladeshi women writers
Bangladeshi women academics
Year of birth missing (living people)